The Sierra del Ajusco-Chichinauhtzin, (Ajusco-Chichinautzin Mountain Range) also known as Serranía del Ajusco or Sierra de Chichinauhtzin, is a Mexican mountain range located between Mexico City and the states of Morelos and Mexico. It makes up the southern part of the mountain necklace that surrounds Mexico City. It is made up of more than one hundred volcanic cones, among which are: Tláloc ( MAMSL), Chichinauhtzin (Xitle (Cerro Pelado ( and Cuauhtzin (. Its maximum height is at the Cruz del Marqués peak on the Ajusco volcano.

Background 
The range includes parts of the municipalities of Tlalpan, Xochimilco, Tláhuac, Milpa Alta and Magdalena Contreras on the south of Mexico City; the municipalities of Huitzilac, Tepoztlán and Tlalnepantla in Morelos; and the municipalities of Juchitepec and Tepetlixpa, in the State of Mexico. These mountains form the highest point as well as the southern limit of Mexico City, separating the Valley of Mexico from the Cuernavaca Valley and the Tepozteco mountain range. 

The range emerged during the Quaternary period, with intense volcanic activity that closed the lacustrine basin of Mexico, depriving it of its only natural drainage towards the Balsas river basin. Ajusco is part of the geological subprovince of the lakes and volcanoes of the Anahuac, located within the Trans-Mexican Volcanic Belt.

Environment
The range is home to the Cumbres del Ajusco National Park,  and the area is part of the Ajusco Chichinautzin Biological Corridor.

The area has diverse habitats and species due to its unique geographic and climatic conditions. There are 315 species of fungi, 10 species of amphibians, 43 species of reptiles, 1,348 species of insects and spiders, 237 of birds (36 exclusive to this region), 5 species of fish, 785 of plants, and 7 types of vegetation in addition to forests of pine, oyamel and oak.

See also
Sierra Chichinautzin

References

External links

Further reading

Trans-Mexican Volcanic Belt
Mountain ranges of Mexico